Seul au Piano, also referred to as Pierre Lapointe Seul au Piano, is an album by Canadian Québécois singer Pierre Lapointe, recorded in November 2010 and released in January 2011. The album reached a peak position of number two on Billboard Top Canadian Albums chart.

Composition
Seul au Piano contains sixteen tracks, all written or co-written by Lapointe. "Reine Émilie" originally appeared on Lapointe's self-titled album (2004). "Le Lion Imberbe", "27-100 Rue des Partances" (as "Au 27-100 Rue de Partances"), "Deux par Deux Rassemblés", "De Glace" and "Tous les Visages" originally appeared on Lapointe's 2006 album La Forêt des Mal-Aimés. "Ces Étranges Lueurs" and "Le Magnétisme des Amants", performed as a single track on Seul au Piano, and "Au Bar Des Suicidés", co-written by Philippe Bergeron, originally appeared on Lapointe's 2009 album Sentiments Humains.

Reception

Adam Greenberg of AllMusic rated the album 3.5 out of 5 stars.

Seul au Piano reached a peak position of number two on Billboard Top Canadian Albums chart.

Track listing

All tracks written by Lapointe, unless noted otherwise.
 "Le Lion Imberbe" – 3:12
 "Ces Étranges Lueurs/Le Magnétisme des Amants" – 3:56
 "Les Vertiges d'en Haut" – 2:52
 "27-100 Rue des Partances" – 3:12
 "Moi, Elsie" (Richard Desjardins, Lapointe) – 5:20
 "Maman" – 3:20
 "Nous Restions Là" – 4:12
 "Deux par Deux Rassemblés" – 3:56
 "De Glace" – 3:36
 "L' Amour Solaire" – 4:05
 "Tous les Visages" – 2:38
 "Les Lignes de la Main" – 2:41
 "Les Sentiments Humains" – 4:55
 "Rappel" – 2:54
 "Reine Émilie" – 3:42
 "Au Bar des Suicidés" (Philippe Bergeron, Lapointe) – 15:01

Track listing adapted from AllMusic.

Personnel
 Philippe Bergeron – composer
 Richard Desjardins – composer
 Pierre Lapointe – composer, primary artist
 John Londono – photography
 Simon Rivest – design

Credits adapted from AllMusic.

Release history

Release history adapted from AllMusic.

References

2011 albums
French-language albums
Pierre Lapointe albums
World music albums by Canadian artists